Mary Brewster (April 17, 1627) was a Pilgrim and one of the women on the Mayflower. She was the wife of Elder William Brewster. She was one of only five adult women from the Mayflower to survive the first winter in the New World, and one of only four such to survive to the "first Thanksgiving" in 1621, which she helped cook. As such, she is included in Plimoth Plantation's reenactment of that Thanksgiving.

She had six children with William: Jonathan, Patience, Fear, Love, an unnamed child who died young, and Wrestling. 

Her son, Jonathan Brewster (1593-1659) and his wife Lucretia Oldham, had nine children. One of those children was also named Mary Brewster.

Her life in England is unknown, as is her maiden name; maiden names of Wentworth, Love, Wyrall, and others have been suggested.

References

Further reading
 Of Mary Brewster: the identity of Mary, wife of elder William Brewster of the Mayflower voyage of 1620 from Plymouth, England, to New Plymouth, New England, by John Griffiths Hunt (1984) 
 The Brewster Genealogy, 1566–1907: a Record of the Descendants of William Brewster of the "Mayflower," ruling elder of the Pilgrim church which founded Plymouth Colony in 1620, by Emma C. Brewster Jones, New York: Grafton Press. (1908)

Year of birth uncertain
1560s births
1627 deaths
People of colonial Massachusetts
17th-century English women
16th-century  English women
17th-century American women
16th-century American women
Mayflower passengers